Mick Burns (7 June 1908 – 5 September 1982) was an English professional footballer who played as a goalkeeper. During his career he made over 100 appearances for Newcastle United (taking over from Willie Wilson at the end of 1928), and over 150 appearances for Ipswich Town. Born in Leeholme, he also had a spell at Preston North End, featuring on the losing side in the 1937 FA Cup Final.

Burns played his last Football League game for Ipswich in the Third Division South on 6 October 1951, meaning that almost 60 years later he is still among the oldest players ever to have appeared in the Football League - having been 121 days past his 43rd birthday when he bowed out.

References

External links 
 
 Mick Burns at Pride of Anglia

1908 births
1982 deaths
Association football goalkeepers
Preston North End F.C. players
Ipswich Town F.C. players
Newcastle United F.C. players
English footballers
English Football League players
FA Cup Final players
Footballers from County Durham